Kounice is a market town in Nymburk District in the Central Bohemian Region of the Czech Republic. It has about 1,600 inhabitants.

Geography
It lies in the Central Elbe Table. The Kounický Stream springs here and flows through the market town.

History
The first written mention of Kounice is in a deed of Queen Margaret from 1257. The Renaissance fortress was built before 1554. The House of Liechtenstein owned the village from 1772 until the establishment of an independent municipality. In 1871, Kounice was promoted to a market town.

Transport
The D11 motorway (part of the European route E67) from Prague to Hradec Králové briefly passes through the northern part of the municipal territory.

Sights
One of the main landmarks of Kounice is the Church of Saint James the Great. It is an Empire style church built in 1834–1836, but it has a tower of medieval origin, which remained from the old church.

The second landmark is the Kounice Castle. It is a Baroque building with a Renaissance core. After it was destroyed by fire in 1990, only necessary repairs were carried out and the castle has been falling into disrepair ever since.

References

External links

Market towns in the Czech Republic